Novosurmetovo (Yañı Sörmät) is a rural locality (a village) in Chekmagushevsky District, Bashkortostan, Russia. The population was 7 as of 2010. There is 1 street.

Geography 
Novosurmetovo is located 31 km southwest of Chekmagush (the district's administrative centre) by road. Yana Birde is the nearest rural locality.

References 

Rural localities in Chekmagushevsky District